Pi Day is an annual celebration of the mathematical constant  (pi). It was founded in 1988 by Larry Shaw, an employee of the San Francisco, California science museum, the Exploratorium. Celebrations often involve eating pie or holding pi recitation competitions. In 2009, the United States House of Representatives supported the designation of Pi Day. UNESCO's 40th General Conference designated Pi Day as the International Day of Mathematics in November 2019. Alternative dates for the holiday include July 22 (22/7, an approximation of ) and June 28 (6.28, an approximation of 2 or tau).

History 
In 1988, the earliest known official or large-scale celebration of Pi Day was organized by Larry Shaw at the San Francisco Exploratorium, where Shaw worked as a physicist, with staff and public marching around one of its circular spaces, then consuming fruit pies. The Exploratorium continues to hold Pi Day celebrations.

On March 12, 2009, the U.S. House of Representatives passed a non-binding resolution (111 H. Res. 224), recognizing March 14, 2009, as National Pi Day. For Pi Day 2010, Google presented a Google Doodle celebrating the holiday, with the word Google laid over images of circles and pi symbols; and for the 30th anniversary in 2018, it was a Dominique Ansel pie with the circumference divided by its diameter. In Indonesia, as a country that uses the DD/MM/YYYY date format, some people celebrate Pi Day every July 22, referring to another Pi number, namely 22/7.

Some observed the entire month of March 2014 (3/14) as "Pi Month". In the year 2015, March 14 was celebrated as "Super Pi Day". It had special significance, as the date is written as 3/14/15 in month/day/year format.

Observance 
Pi Day has been observed in many ways, including eating pie, throwing pies and discussing the significance of the number , due to a pun based on the words "pi" and "pie" being homophones in English, and the coincidental circular shape of many pies. Many pizza and pie restaurants offer discounts, deals, and free products on Pi Day. Also, some schools hold competitions as to which student can recall pi to the highest number of decimal places.

The Massachusetts Institute of Technology has often mailed its application decision letters to prospective students for delivery on Pi Day. Starting in 2012, MIT has announced it will post those decisions (privately) online on Pi Day at exactly 6:28 pm, which they have called "Tau Time", to honor the rival numbers pi and tau equally. In 2015, the regular decisions were put online at 9:26 am, following that year's "pi minute", and in 2020, regular decisions were released at 1:59 pm, making the first six digits of pi. 

June 28 is "Two Pi Day", also known as "Tau Day". 2, also known by the Greek letter tau is a common multiple in mathematical formulae. Some have argued that τ is the more fundamental constant and that Tau Day should be celebrated instead. Celebrations of this date jokingly suggest eating "twice the pie".

Princeton, New Jersey, hosts numerous events in a combined celebration of Pi Day and Albert Einstein's birthday, which is also March 14. Einstein lived in Princeton for more than twenty years while working at the Institute for Advanced Study. In addition to pie eating and recitation contests, there is an annual Einstein look-alike contest.

Alternative dates 
Pi Day is frequently observed on March 14 (3/14 in the month/day date format), but related celebrations have been held on alternative dates.

Two Pi Day, also known as Tau Day for the mathematical constant tau, which is approximated as 6.28, is observed on June 28 (6/28 in the month/day format).

Pi Approximation Day is also observed on November 10 since it is the 314th day of the year.

See also 
Mole Day
Sequential time
Square Root Day
White Day, also on March 14
Unofficial holidays, awareness days, and other observances

Notes

References

External links

Exploratorium's Pi Day Web Site
NPR provides a "Pi Rap" audiovideo
Pi Day
Professor Lesser's Pi Day page

1988 establishments in California
March observances
July observances
Observances about science
Pi
Recurring events established in 1988
Unofficial observances